General elections were held in Turkey on 5 June 1977. Elections took place in the middle of a political race between the right-wing AP and the left-wing CHP. With the charismatic leadership of Bülent Ecevit, the CHP managed to beat one of the symbolic figures of conservative politics in Turkey, Süleyman Demirel. Voter turnout was 72.4%.

The CHP's victory was the zenith of left-wing votes in the history of the Republic of Turkey, but there were still no capable partners for the CHP to join forces to form government with since the remainder of parliament consisted of right-wing parties not eager to form a coalition with Bülent Ecevit. Finally, the CHP could not gain a vote of confidence. They would need to wait until 1978 to gain support from some smaller parties and independents to govern. The CHP could not retain power for long and soon government control passed on to the AP even as the rumblings of the 1980 military coup were beginning to be felt.

Results

References

General elections in Turkey
General
Turkey
Turkey